Honk, the Moose is a children's book by Phil Stong. It tells the story of a moose who takes over a small town which causes an uproar when three young boys try to save the moose and make it through the cold Minnesota winter. The book, illustrated by Kurt Wiese, was first published in 1935, and was a Newbery Honor recipient in 1936. In 1970, it won the Lewis Carroll Shelf Award, and was listed in Cattermole's 100 Best Children's Books of the 20th Century. Based on a true story from Biwabik, Minnesota, it effectively describes the lives of Finnish immigrants there.

References

1935 American novels
American children's novels
Fictional deer and moose
Newbery Honor-winning works
Novels set in Minnesota
Children's novels about animals
St. Louis County, Minnesota
1935 children's books
Books illustrated by Kurt Wiese